The Second Athenian League was a maritime confederation of Aegean city-states from 378 to 355 BC and headed by Athens, primarily for self-defense against the growth of Sparta and secondly, the Persian Empire.

Background 
In 478 BC, Athens founded the Delian League to counter Persian influence during the Greco-Persian Wars. Athenian leadership became solidified over the next few decades, with many historians considering the league to be an Athenian Empire, especially after the treasury was moved from Delos to Athens in 454 BC. This league fought against the Peloponnesian League, dominated by Sparta, in the Peloponnesian War, which lasted from 431 to 404 BC. It ended after a siege of Athens in 404 BC, when Athens and Sparta struck a peace deal establishing Spartan hegemony over the Greek world. The Corinthians and Thebans, both Spartan allies, wanted to destroy Athens and enslave its citizens instead of a more lenient peace deal. The Spartans rejected this due to Athens being a major factor in holding up the balance of power in the Attica, Boiotia and Isthmos regions, and instead imposed the following terms: the Athenian walls and fortifications were to be destroyed, the Athenian fleet was to be decommissioned except for twelve ships, Athenian exiles were to be allowed back to the city, and Athens was to acknowledge Spartan leadership and join the Spartan alliance network, allowing Sparta to dictate its foreign policy.

Sparta's former allies turned against it in 395 BC, with Thebes instigating a Spartan attack that would lead to the Corinthian War. This pit Sparta against a coalition of Athens, Thebes, Corinth, and Argos, which was backed by Persia. After a series of Athenian successes, Persia enforced the Peace of Antalcidas: it would take control of all Greek cities in Asia Minor as well as the island of Cyprus and guarantee the independence of all other Greek cities with the exceptions of Lemnos, Imbros, and Scyros, which would belong to Athens. This war empowered Athens for the first time since the end of the Peloponnesian War, allowing it to rebuild its previously decommissioned fortifications and its navy.

Origins 
 
The formation of the League was stimulated by three major events that caused relations between Athens and Sparta to deteriorate. The first event was Spartan intervention in a factional conflict within Thebes. In 382 BC, Sparta sent a force led by the general Eudamidas and his brother Phoebidas to combat the expansion of Olynthus in Chalkidiki, northern Greece. On the way to Olynthus Phoebidas stopped near Thebes, where the two polemarchs Ismenias and Leontiades were locked in a power struggle for control of Thebes. Ismenias was pro-democracy and anti-Sparta so Leontiades convinced Phoebidas, who is described by Xenophon as driven by desire to perform good deeds but lacking in reasoning capacity, that it would be in Sparta's interest to help him take control of Thebes. Phoebidas agreed and helped him take the citadel and imprison Ismenias, which led to about 300 of his supporters fleeing in exile to Athens. Although this Spartan interference in Thebes represented a flagrant violation of the Peace of Antalcidas, Leontiades argued that the Spartans should not punish Phoebidas because his actions had only served to help Sparta. The Spartans agreed, deciding to keep the Thebian citadel and put Ismenias to death.

The second event was the outbreak of the Boeotian War, directly caused by the Spartan intervention in Thebes. In 378 BC, some of the exiles from this intervention returned to Thebes and assassinated Leontiades, overthrowing the pro-Spartan tyranny. The Spartan governor sent for reinforcements, but they were destroyed during their approach by Theban cavalry. The cavalry then stormed the Theban acropolis and restored a popular anti-Spartan government. This led to war between Sparta and Thebes.

The third event was the invasion of Piraeus, an Athenian port in Attica, by the Spartan general Sphodrias in winter of 378 BC. Diodorus Siculus claims that the invasion was ordered by the Spartan king Cleombrotus, while other historians like Xenophon argue that Sphodrias was bribed by Thebes as part of a plot to bring Athens to their side in the war against Sparta. The Spartan ambassadors stationed in Athens promised that Sphodrias would be convicted and punished in Sparta, but he was acquitted in what Siculus calls a "miscarriage of justice". This caused Athens to seek alliances against Sparta, so they reached out to Aegean cities under harsh Spartan control including Chios, Byzantium, Rhodes, and Mytilene. These cities sent representatives to Athens who signed the Decree of Aristoteles, which outlined the terms of the Second Athenian League.

Charter and policy 
An inscribed prospectus for the League was found at Athens dating to 377 BC, detailing the aims of the new league. The terms of the league were as follows: meetings would be held in Athens, but every city would enjoy one vote no matter its size and would retain its independence. Unlike the terms of the Delian League, these terms did not include forced garrisons or tribute, and Athenian citizens were prohibited from owning property in other member states. Athens framed these terms as a departure from those of the Delian League, which had been unpopular among tribute states due to the ruthlessness of Athenian hegemony and the harsh punishments against states that rebelled. Athens also convinced foreign powers, including Sparta and Persia, that the charter was a way to enforce the Peace of Antalcidas instead of a subversion of it.

Many historians consider the Second Athenian League to be a resurgence of Athenian hegemony over Greece. Some, such as the historian of ancient Greece Jack Cargill, argue that this league was different from the Delian League and that it did not represent a new Athenian Empire. He argues that the main cause of defections was Thebes, which left the league in 371 BC and incited other states to leave.

Rise of Thebes
Thebes joined the league at its founding because one of the main points of the charter was opposition to Sparta. However, relations between Thebes and the rest of the league soon became difficult and Athens started to realize that Thebes was not necessarily to be trusted. For example, Thebes destroyed Plataea in 372 BC, which had only recently been re-founded. Athens started to think about negotiating peace with Sparta; it was while Athens was discussing this with Sparta that Thebes defeated the Spartan army decisively at the Battle of Leuctra (371 BC). This led to the end of the Boeotian War and, with it, Spartan hegemony over Greece. Thebes soon left the league and established hegemony of its own.

Later history and disintegration
After Sparta's defeat in 371 BC, Thebes seceded from the League and was able to violate the terms of the Peace of Antalcidas with impunity. Later, a series of revolts rocked the league, culminating with the Social War (357–355 BC) in which the states of Chios, Rhodes, Kos, and Byzantium went to war against Athens. This war ended in the disintegration of the Second Athenian League.

See also
Athenian Grain-Tax Law of 374/3 B.C.

References

Further reading
Cargill, Jack. The Second Athenian League: Empire or Free Alliance? Berkeley: University of California Press, 1981. 
 
Rhodes, P. J. A History of the Classical Greek World, 478-323BC. Blackwell Publishing, 2005.

Athenian Empire
Late Classical Greece
4th-century BC military alliances
4th century BC in Greece
Greek city-state federations